"On The Way To Cape May" is a song that has become a Jersey Shore sound summertime anthem for the Philadelphia/Delaware Valley and South Jersey Shore area. It was written by Maurice "Buddy" Nugent according to BMI and The Philadelphia Inquirer. The song became popular without the push of a major record label.

Originally, the tune circulated from one band to another around Cape May County in the second half of the 20th century. Early versions came from singers like Daddy Beans and Don Cornell. Cozy Morley advanced its popularity with his large local following. The song became even more locally widespread when Al Alberts recorded it and increased its broadcast exposure on radio and TV. Today, the top selling version is the Philly Cuzz rendition, which has a Bobby Darin inspired arrangement. It has become popular in a variety of 21st century media, such as XM satellite and internet radio, and also enjoys regular airplay on many Delaware Valley AM and FM stations.

The lyrics are about a love story and journey which begins with the intro mentioning Ocean City. Traveling southward, the lyrics then continue with mentions of  Sea Isle City; Avalon; Stone Harbor; Wildwood coming into view and talks of marriage around the town of Cape May Court House. The words never actually say anything about the town of Cape May. And though that town is the target destination, it's more about a journey through Cape May County.

The "Breakfast Club" on 98.1 WOGL plays the Al Alberts version every Friday morning between the Friday preceding Memorial Day through and including the Friday before Labor Day.

Harry Kalas, the 2002 Ford C. Frick Award winner honored by the Baseball Hall of Fame, who was the late voice of the Philadelphia Phillies, had an avid affection for this song and can be seen singing the chorus at the end of the WHYY-TV biography produced in 2004.

As per the Cape May County Library
"A love story that begins in Ocean City and wends its way along the Jersey Shore through Sea Isle City, Avalon, Stone Harbor, Cape May Court House, Wildwood, and romantic Cape May." (Words and music by Bud Nugent, 1960).  Popular comedian Cozy Morley, who owned a nightclub in Wildwood for many years (a life-size statue of him now stands in front of his nightclub), made "On the Way to Cape May" his signature song and performed it many times during his acts in the Philadelphia-South Jersey region.  He lived in Collingswood, NJ, for many years and retired to Wildwood.

References

External links
Lyrics as found on the Cape May County Library

Regional songs
Culture of Philadelphia
Cape May, New Jersey
North American anthems